Octagon Chapel in England may refer to:

Octagon Chapel, Bath, Somerset
Octagon Chapel, Liverpool, Merseyside
Octagon Chapel, Norwich, Norfolk
 Octagon Church aka Octagon Chapel, Wisbech, Isle of Ely

See also
 List of octagonal buildings and structures
 Octagonal churches in Norway